is a Japanese manga series written and illustrated by Shin Takahashi. It was irregularly serialized in Shogakukan's seinen manga magazine Weekly Big Comic Spirits from December 2007 to June 2019.

Publication
Written and illustrated by Shin Takahashi, Hana to Oku-tan debuted in Shogakukan's seinen manga magazine Weekly Big Comic Spirits on December 10, 2007. A "chapter zero" was published in the inaugural issue of Monthly Big Comic Spirits on August 27, 2009. The manga was irregularly serialized in Weekly Big Comic Spirits, and finished on June 17, 2019. Shogakukan collected its chapters in five tankōbon volumes, released from April 30, 2009, to September 30, 2019.

Volume list

Reception
Hana to Oku-tan was one of the Jury Recommended Works at the 18th Japan Media Arts Festival in 2014.

References

External links
 

Science fiction anime and manga
Seinen manga
Slice of life anime and manga
Shogakukan manga